Le Haut-Bréda is a commune in the Isère department in southeastern France. It was established on 1 January 2019 by merger of the former communes of La Ferrière (the seat) and Pinsot.

See also
Communes of the Isère department

References

Communes of Isère